The Kansas State–Nebraska football rivalry was an American college football rivalry between the Kansas State Wildcats and Nebraska Cornhuskers.

The schools first met as non-conference opponents in 1911, and then played a conference game annually from 1922 to 2010, first in the Big Eight and later in the Big 12. The rivalry dissolved when Nebraska left the Big 12 for the Big Ten in 2011. With only 135 miles separating the two schools, Nebraska and Kansas State were the nearest cross-border schools in both the Big Eight and Big 12 conferences.

History

The 1939 meeting between Kansas State and Nebraska was televised in Manhattan, making it the second-ever televised college football game. In 1992, the teams met in the Coca-Cola Classic at the Tokyo Dome in Tokyo, Japan. Nebraska defeated Kansas State 38–24 to clinch the Big Eight championship.

When the Big Eight merged with the Southwest Conference in 1996, Nebraska and Kansas State were placed into the Big 12 North division. The Wildcats never defeated legendary Nebraska coach Tom Osborne, who retired in 1997, but the two schools played several high-profile games in the years that followed as Bill Snyder solidified Kansas State as a program of note.

The most famous game in series history took place in 1998, when Kansas State ended its 29-year losing streak to Nebraska; this was also the first meeting in which Kansas State was the higher-ranked team. College Gameday visited Manhattan for the first time, and the No. 2 Wildcats used 26 second-half points to hold off No. 11 Nebraska, in its first year under head coach Frank Solich. This game is also noteworthy for an uncalled face mask penalty by KSU defender Travis Ochs on Nebraska quarterback Eric Crouch, and a picture of Crouch with his helmet backward became the game's most enduring image.

The final game between Nebraska and Kansas State was a 48–13 NU victory on October 7, 2010. No future games are scheduled, though there have been discussions between the two schools of renewing the rivalry.

Game results

See also  
 List of NCAA college football rivalry games

References

College football rivalries in the United States
Kansas State Wildcats football
Nebraska Cornhuskers football
Recurring sporting events established in 1911